James Down (born 29 August 1987) is a rugby union player for the Russian club Lokomotiv Penza. His position of choice is second row.

On 23 July 2014, Down moved to England to join London Welsh in the Aviva Premiership from the 2014–15 season. but returned to Cardiff in the following season.

References

External links
 Cardiff Blues profile

Welsh rugby union players
Cardiff Rugby players
1987 births
Living people
Rugby union players from Bridgend
London Welsh RFC players
Lokomotiv Penza players
Rugby union locks